Brian Kynaston Waugh (1922–1984) was a notable New Zealand aircraft engineer, military and commercial aviator, airline operator, meteorologist. He was born in Shrewsbury, Shropshire, England in 1922.

Early years
Born at Shrewsbury, Shropshire, England, on 26 September 1922, Brian Kynaston Waugh was the second of two sons of Helen Elizabeth Caudle and her husband, Walter Waugh, an electrical engineer. He developed an early fascination with aviation after his father became a foreman on the construction of an RAF station in Shropshire. In August 1938 he joined the RAF’s aircraft apprentice training scheme, and in 1941 he was posted to South Africa. While there, he transferred to pilot training, gaining his wings on 24 September 1943.

References

1922 births
1984 deaths
New Zealand military personnel
New Zealand aviators
New Zealand meteorologists
Military personnel from Shrewsbury
British emigrants to New Zealand
Trenchard Brats
Commercial aviators
20th-century New Zealand engineers